Norman Reginald Legge (20 April 1919 – 28 March 2004) was a Canadian researcher for the Shell Oil Company and pioneer of thermoplastic elastomers, Kraton in particular.

Personal 
Legge was born on 20 April 1919 in Edmonton, Alberta, Canada. He died on 28 March 2004 in Livermore, California.

Education 
 1942 BSC, Chemistry, University of Alberta
 1943 MSC, Chemistry, University of Alberta
 1945 Ph.D., McGill University, explosives research during World War II.

Career 

Legge worked as a research chemist for Polymer Corporation (formerly Polysar Corp.) in Sarnia, Ontario (1945-1951). Later, he moved to Kentucky Synthetic Rubber Corporation as Director of Research in Louisville.  He then moved to Shell Chemical until his retirement.

He was a Fellow of the American Association for the Advancement of Science and a member of the American Chemical Society, Rubber Division.

Awards and Recognitions

 1987 - Charles Goodyear Medal from the ACS Rubber Division
 1992 - IISRP Technical Award from the International Institute of Synthetic Rubber Producers

External links
 Audio interview with Norman Legge.

References 

1919 births
2004 deaths
Polymer scientists and engineers
Scientists from Edmonton
University of Alberta alumni
McGill University alumni